Cuba competed at the 2000 Summer Olympics held in Australia's largest city, Sydney. 229 competitors, 147 men and 82 women, took part in 135 events in 24 sports.

Medalists

Archery

Cuba's first appearance in the Olympic archery competition resulted in a surprise pair of victories.
Men

Women

Athletics

Men's track

Men's field

Women's track

Women's field

Decathlon

Heptathlon

Baseball

Basketball

Women's tournament
Team roster
Liset Castillo  
Milayda Enríquez  
Cariola Hechavarría  
Dalia Henry  
Grisel Herrera  
María León   
Yamilé Martínez 
Yaquelín Plutín  
Tania Seino  
Yuliseny Soria 
Taimara Suero
Lisdeivis Víctores

Summary

Beach volleyball

Boxing

Canoeing

Sprint
Men's

Cycling

Road cycling

Track cycling
Sprint

Time trial

Diving

Men's

Women's

Fencing

Eleven fencers, seven men and four women, represented Cuba in 2000.
Men

Women

Gymnastics

Men's artistic

Handball

Men's tournament
 Amauris Cardenas
 Damian Cuesta
 Diego Wong
 Félix Romero
 Freddy Suárez
 José Hernández
 Juan González
 Luis Silveira
 Miguel Montes
 Misael Iglesias
 Odael Marcos
 Raúl Hardy
 Rolando Uríos
 Yunier Noris

Judo

Men

Women

Rowing

Men

Women

Sailing

Shooting

Men

Women

Softball

Women's tournament
Team roster
Vilma Álvarez 
María Arceo
Yuneisy Castillo
Yamila Degrase
Laritza Espinosa 
Yamila Flor
Haydée Hernández 
Luisa Medina
Estela Milañes 
Yarisleidis Peña
Diamela Puentes
Niolis Ramos
Olga Ruyol 
María Santana 
María Zamora

Summary

Swimming

Men

Women

Synchronized swimming

Table tennis

Taekwondo

Men

Women

Volleyball

Men's roster
Alexei Argilagos
Ángel Dennis
Raúl Diago
Yosenki García
Ramón Gato 
Ihosvany Hernández 
Osvaldo Hernández
Leonel Marshall
Pavel Pimienta 
Alain Roca
Iván Ruíz
Nicolás Vives
Head coach: Juan Díaz Marino

Women's roster
Taismary Agüero 
Zoila Barros
Regla Bell
Marlenis Costa
Ana Fernández
Mirka Francia
Lilia Izquierdo
Mireya Luis
Raisa O'Farril
Yumilka Ruíz
Martha Sánchez
Regla Torres
Head coach: Luis Felipe Calderón

Summary

Weightlifting

Men

Wrestling

Men's freestyle

Men's Greco-Roman

See also
 Cuba at the 1999 Pan American Games
 Cuba at the 2000 Summer Paralympics

Notes

Wallechinsky, David (2004). The Complete Book of the Summer Olympics (Athens 2004 Edition). Toronto, Canada. . 
International Olympic Committee (2001). The Results. Retrieved 12 November 2005.
Sydney Organising Committee for the Olympic Games (2001). Official Report of the XXVII Olympiad Volume 1: Preparing for the Games. Retrieved 20 November 2005.
Sydney Organising Committee for the Olympic Games (2001). Official Report of the XXVII Olympiad Volume 2: Celebrating the Games. Retrieved 20 November 2005.
Sydney Organising Committee for the Olympic Games (2001). The Results. Retrieved 20 November 2005.
International Olympic Committee Web Site

References

Nations at the 2000 Summer Olympics
2000 Summer Olympics
2000 in Cuban sport